Liga or LIGA may refer to:

People 
 Līga (name), a Latvian female given name
 Luciano Ligabue, more commonly known as Ligabue or Liga, Italian rock singer-songwriter

Sports
 Liga ACB, men's professional basketball league in Spain
 Liga Deportiva Alajuelense, football club from Costa Rica commonly known as "La Liga"
 Liga Deportiva Universitaria, Ecuadorian professional football club based in Quito
 Liga Elitelor, a system of youth Romanian football leagues covering the under-17 and under-19 age groups
 Liga Femenina de Baloncesto, women's professional basketball league in Spain
 Liga MX, highest professional division of the Mexican football league system
 Liga Portugal, highest professional division of the Portuguese football league system
 Liga Portugal 2, second highest professional division of the Portuguese football league system
 Liga I, highest professional division of the Romanian football league system
 Liga 1 (Indonesia), highest professional division of the Indonesian football league system
 Liga 3 (Portugal), third highest professional division of the Portuguese football league system
 La Liga, highest professional division of the Spanish football league system

Other uses
 Liga (TV channel), a defunct Philippine sports television network
 LIGA, common appellation for the Hungarian national trade union Független Szakszervezetek Demokratikus Ligája or Democratic Confederation of Free Trade Unions 
 LIGA, acronym of Lithographie, Galvanoformung, Abformung ("Lithography, Electroplating, and Molding"), fabrication technology used to create high-aspect-ratio microstructures
 L.I.G.A, Danish urban pop trio
 Liga, a hardwood that is carved to form the keys of the gyil musical instrument of the Gur-speaking peoples of Ghana and neighbouring West African nations

See also

1. Liga (disambiguation)
2. Liga (disambiguation)
3. Liga (disambiguation)
4. Liga (disambiguation)
Lega (disambiguation)
Liga 1 (disambiguation)
Liga 2 (disambiguation)
Liga 3 (disambiguation)
Prva Liga (disambiguation)
Druga Liga (disambiguation)
Vysshaya Liga (disambiguation)
Superliga (disambiguation)
League (disambiguation)